Mahrugi-ye Sofla (also Romanized as Maḩrūgī-ye Soflá; also known as Maḩrūqī-ye Soflá) is a village in Buzi Rural District, in the Central District of Shadegan County, Khuzestan Province, Iran. At the 2006 census, its population was 360, in 61 families.

References 

Populated places in Shadegan County